Kayaköy (literally "rock ville") is a town in İzmir Province, Turkey

Geography 

Kayaköy is a part of Ödemiş district of İzmir province. The population of Kayaköy was 1331  at 2011.

History 

The area around Kayaköy was a zeamet (a kind of fief) during Ottoman era. But beginning by the 19th century, Ottoman government began settling nomadic tribes to former fief lands. A part of the Turkmen tribe of Sarıkeçili from South Anatolia was settled in Kayaköy. Kayaköy was declared a seat of township in 1990.

Economy

Kayaköy is situated in a fertile plain. But irrigation facilities need to be developed. Once popular industrial crops like tobacco and cotton are no more popular. They are replaced by potato, pepper and watermelon. Animal husbandry and dairy farming, the traditional source of living of the nomads, are still popular.

Trivia 

The mansion of Çakırcalı Mehmet Efe, a bandit and a folk hero, is in Kayaköy and the governance of İzmir Province has decided to restore the mansion. (His grave is also in Kayaköy.)

References

Populated places in İzmir Province
Towns in Turkey
Ödemiş District